Damian Sperz (born 29 March 1990) is a Polish speedway rider who is a member of the Polish under-21 national team.

Career details

World Championships 

 Individual U-21 World Championship
 2009 - lost in the Domestic Qualification Final
 2010 - 1 pt in the Gdańsk' Final One (lost in the Gdańsk' Qualifying Round also)

European Championships 

 Individual U-19 European Championship
 2008 - as a track reserve in the Domestic Qualification
 2009 - lost in the Semi-Final One

Domestic competitions 

 Individual Polish Championship
 2008 - lost in the Gdańsk' Quarter-Final
 2009 - lost in the Piła' Quarter-Final
 Individual U-21 Polish Championship
 2008 - lost in the Poznań' Semi-Final
 2009 - lost in the Gniiezno' Qualifying Round
 Silver Helmet (U-21)
 2008 - windraw from the Częstochowa' Semi-Final
 2009 -  Częstochowa - 15th placed (3 pts)
 2010 -  Bydgoszcz - quality to the Final (August 12)
 Bronze Helmet (U-19)
 2008 -  Gdańsk - 4th placed (11 pts)
 2009 -  Wrocław - 7th placed (8 pts)

See also 
 Poland national speedway team
 Speedway in Poland

References

External links 
 (Polish) www.DamianSperz.pl - official website

Polish speedway riders
1990 births
Living people
Sportspeople from Gdańsk